Mount Jordan is a remote  mountain summit located on the Kings–Kern Divide of the Sierra Nevada mountain range, in Tulare County of northern California. Mount Jordan ranks as the 84th highest summit in California, and the fifth-highest peak on the Kings–Kern Divide.

History

The mountain's name was proposed by the Sierra Club in 1925 to honor David Starr Jordan (1851–1931), the founding president of Stanford University. This mountain's name was officially adopted in 1926 by the United States Board on Geographic Names.

Dr. Jordan, with a party of Stanford associates, spent several weeks of 1899 in the Bubbs Creek region, exploring and mapping Ouzel Creek, to which he gave its name, and he climbed Mount Stanford on August 16, 1899.

In July 2020, the president of the Sierra Club denounced Jordan for being one of the "vocal advocates for white supremacy and its pseudo-scientific arm, eugenics." The president also announced, "We will also spend the next year studying our history and determining which of our monuments need to be renamed or pulled down entirely." It is not yet clear on how such a reassessment would affect the status of Mount Jordan, which the club had helped to name.

The probable first ascent of the lower north summit was made July 15, 1925, by Norman Clyde, who is credited with 130 first ascents, most of which were in the Sierra Nevada.

Climbing

Established climbing routes:

 From the south – First ascent in 1936, by two Sierra Club parties led by Lewis Clark and Carl Jensen
 North face – August 3, 1940, by Art Argiewicz and six others
 West face – descended August 3, 1940, by Art Argiewicz and party

Climate
Mount Jordan is located in an alpine climate zone. Most weather fronts originate in the Pacific Ocean, and travel east toward the Sierra Nevada mountains. As fronts approach, they are forced upward by the peaks, causing them to drop their moisture in the form of rain or snowfall onto the range (orographic lift). Precipitation runoff from the mountain drains north to Bubbs Creek, and south into headwaters of the Kern River.

See also

 List of mountain peaks of California

References

External links
 Weather forecast: Mount Jordan

Mountains of Tulare County, California
Mountains of Kings Canyon National Park
Mountains of Sequoia National Park
North American 4000 m summits
Mountains of Northern California
Sierra Nevada (United States)